Mayo Mansion, also known as Fetter Mansion, is a historic mansion located in the Bath Avenue Historic District in downtown Ashland, Kentucky.

History

Following the death of her husband, John C. C. Mayo, Alice Jane Mayo moved to Florida. In 1916, she met Dr. Samuel P. Fetter of Portsmouth, Ohio, while he was recovering from an illness at Palm Beach, Florida. They married the following year and purchased the Victorian Gartrell-Hager House in Ashland, Kentucky, which was built in 1864. Although Mayo wanted to build a new house, she could not due to rations set in place during World War I. In order to avoid being arrested for building a new home, she received permission to remodel the existing house. Using the wealth amassed from the Mayo Companies, she rebuilt the entire building, transforming it into a  Beaux-Arts mansion. Much of the interior, including the tile and marble was taken from her and her first husband's other home, also known as Mayo Mansion, in Paintsville, Kentucky.

A large pool house that was attached to the mansion was demolished in the 1950s. Mayo Mansion was occupied by the Highlands Museum and Discovery Center from 1984 until 1994, when the museum moved into the former C.H. Parsons Department Store Building in the Ashland Commercial Historic District.

References

External links
Photos of the demolished pool house
Photo Gallery of the Mansion

Houses on the National Register of Historic Places in Kentucky
National Register of Historic Places in Boyd County, Kentucky
Houses completed in 1917
Houses in Boyd County, Kentucky
Historic district contributing properties in Kentucky
Ashland, Kentucky
1917 establishments in Kentucky
Beaux-Arts architecture in Kentucky